Pitsj is the eponymous debut album by the female Norwegian a cappella quintet, Pitsj. The album was released in 2006 through Grappa Music.

Track listing 
"Voi Voi" (2:19) (Georg Elgaaen / Arr.: Anders Edenroth)
"Sangen om gleden" (3:41) (Erik Hillestad/Sigvart Dagsland / Arr.: Bjørn Kruse)
"Kjære ikkje vekk meg når du går" (2:44) (Ingvar Hovland/Svein Olav Hyttebakk / Arr.: Ane Carmen Roggen)
"Telefon" (2:57) (Jan Eggum / Arr.: Marius Løken)
"Splitter pine" (2:43) (Kjartan Kristiansen / Arr.: Helge Lien/Ane Carmen Roggen)
"Ryktet forteller" (3:35) (Jan Eggum / Arr.: Marius Løken)
"Øyeblikket" (2:57) (Kari Bremnes/Lars Bremnes / Arr.: Bjørn Skjelbred)
"Intet er nytt under solen" (2:39) (Arne Bendiksen / Arr.: Even Kruse Skatrud)
"Tanta til Beate" (3:12) (Lillebjørn Nilsen / Arr.: Børre Dalhaug)
"Et liv for meg" (4:28) (Anders Edenroth / Norsk oversettelse: Stig Krogstad)
"Den du veit" (3:49) (Marius Müller / Arr.: Eyvind Gulbrandsen/Ida Roggen)
"Gåte ved gåte" (3:45) (Kari Bremnes / Arr.: Thor-Erik Fjellvang)
"Jeg reiser alene" (2:40) (Ole Paus / Arr.: Andreas Utnem)

Personnel 
Anine Kruse – vocals
Benedikte Kruse – vocals
Ane Carmen Roggen – vocals
Ida Roggen – vocals
Tora Augestad – vocals
Production
Anders Edenroth – producer

References

External links 

Pitsj official website

Pitsj albums
2006 albums
Grappa Music albums